The Multi-Purpose Solution are an American rock band from New Jersey.

History
The Multi-Purpose Solution is a five-piece rock band from Jersey City, New Jersey that formed in 1999. Guitarist Stephen Mejias and vocalist Peter Prochilo (Jim Teacher) met while studying abroad in England, both college seniors attending Fairleigh Dickinson University. Upon returning to the United States, the two enlisted Prochilo's brother Dan Prochilo and friend Dave Caldwell. The Multi-Purpose Solution were a four-piece band for several years before recruiting their friend Alan Ten Hoeve, a bass-player. According to Mejias, shortly after Hoeve joined they began focusing more on songwriting, practicing at an all-purpose space in Jersey City and playing local venues, such as Hoboken's Maxwell's. Their music is characterized by guttural vocals and piercing guitars. Between 2001 and 2005 the Multi-Purpose Solution released a few EPs and two full-length albums and they appeared on the Weird NJ compilation Local Heroes, Villains, and Artists in 2004. They released How Can a Man Be Tougher Than the World? in 2005. q Later that year, the members took a hiatus, playing their last show for five years in 2006.

Mint 400 Records
They signed to Mint 400 Records in 2011, and digitally reissued their albums. In November of that year, the Multi-Purpose Solution reunited to play Maxwell's with several other Mint 400 Records artists. They appeared on Mint 400 Records Presents the Beach Boys Pet Sounds, covering "Sloop John B," as well as Our First Compilation and Patchwork.

Personnel
Dave Caldwell – drums
Alan Ten Hoeve – bass
Stephen Mejias – guitar
Dan Prochilo – guitar
Peter Prochilo – vocals

Discography

Albums
the mps (2001)
In Bed (2002)
How Can a Man Be Tougher Than the World? (2005)

Appearing on
Local Heroes, Villains, and Artists (2004)
Our First Compilation (2011)
Mint 400 Records Presents the Beach Boys Pet Sounds (2013)
Patchwork (2014)

References

Citations

Bibliography

External links

Mint 400 Records artists
Musical groups established in 1999
Musical groups from New Jersey
Musical quintets
1999 establishments in New Jersey